Eurypetalum is a genus of plants in the family Fabaceae.

It contains the following species:
 Eurypetalum tessmannii Harms
 Eurypetalum unijugum Harms

Detarioideae
Fabaceae genera
Taxonomy articles created by Polbot